The Guardian Year (sometimes worded as the Guardian Year) is an annual, non-fiction, current affairs anthology book of what the editor considers the best content from The Guardian newspaper in the last year.

The book usually comes out in November of that year and includes a variety of topics, such as commentary on politics, art critiques, and editorials, as well as stories reported in Britain or internationally. The editor of the book varies from year to year, and — depending on the year and bookseller — the book can be found as a paperback or hardcover and is usually around 300 pages in length. The Guardian Year is usually published by Atlantic Books, and sometimes by Guardian Books or another book publishing company. The Guardian Year 2005 is the latest copy , and The Guardian Year 2006 has yet to be released.

External links
 "You, the editor" — an explanation by the editor of The Guardian Year 2005 over his choice of articles for the book. On the Guardian Unlimited website.
 Grove Atlantic Ltd — website of the usual publisher of The Guardian Year, Atlantic Books (Grove Atlantic)

Links to each book
 2002 — Fishpond Bookshop
 2002 
 2003 — Fishpond bookstore
 2004 — Politico's Bookstore
 2005 
 2006 

Year
Current affairs books
Guardian Books books